No One Is Too Small to Make a Difference is a book by climate activist Greta Thunberg. It was originally published on 30 May 2019. It consists of a collection of eleven speeches which she has written and presented about global warming and the climate crisis.

History
Greta Thunberg has presented the speeches in front of the United Nations, the European Union, the World Economic Forum and during demonstrations and protests. One of her most famous speeches which appears in the book is "Our House Is on Fire".

The first edition was published on 30 May 2019. An expanded edition was published on 21 November 2019 with five new speeches.

In November 2019, Thunberg was named author of the year by Waterstones for No One is Too Small to Make a Difference.

Speeches
 Our Lives Are in Your Hands(Climate March, Stockholm, 8 September 2018)
 Almost Everything Is Black and White(Declaration of Rebellion, Extinction Rebellion, Parliament Square, London, 31 October 2018)
 Unpopular(United Nations Climate Change Conference, Katowice, Poland, 15 December 2018)
 Prove Me Wrong(World Economic Forum, Davos, 22 January 2019)
 Our House Is on Fire(World Economic Forum, Davos, 25 January 2019)
 I'm Too Young to Do This(Facebook, Stockholm, 2 February 2019)
 You're Acting Like Spoiled, Irresponsible Children(European Economic and Social Committee, Brussels, 21 February 2019)
 A Strange World(Goldene Kamera Film and TV Awards, Berlin, 30 March 2019)
 Cathedral Thinking(European Parliament, Strasbourg, 16 April 2019)
 Together We Are Making a Difference(Extinction Rebellion Rally, Marble Arch, London, 23 April 2019)
 Can You Hear Me?(Houses of Parliament, London, 23 April 2019)

Added in the expanded edition of November 2019

See also
 Scenes from the Heart – a book about Thunberg's family by her mother Malena Ernman (together with Svante Thunberg and their daughters).

References

Further reading
  (2+6+138+1+1 pages) (NB. This expanded edition includes 16 speeches and 66 photos.)

External links 
 

2019 non-fiction books
Climate change books
Works by Greta Thunberg
Books about autistic women
Penguin Books books